Subway circuit is a term that was created before 1914 to define a group of legitimate New York City theaters featuring shows passing out from Broadway and usually prefacing their "going on tour" or used to get a try-out of a show before being sent to Broadway for a verdict. The theater also had to be reachable by New York City subway.

History

Unlike vaudeville managers, who cut salaries of actors when they took the "small time", or entered houses of lesser importance, there were no cuts made in the salaries of the legitimate actors playing the "Subway Circuit". To the actors, four weeks of some subway before or after going on the road was a boon, for the theaters were all within 30 minutes of Broadway and after a performance, they were within easy reach of the theatrical clubs in the theater district.

Theaters

The number of theaters part of the subway circuit has changed over time. This is a non-exhaustive list

1918

 the Montauk Theatre in Brooklyn
 the Teller's Shubert Theatre in Brooklyn
 the Shubert Majestic Theatre in Brooklyn
 the Bronx Opera House
 the Loew's Seventh Avenue Theater
 the Standard Theatre

1921 

 the Montauk Theatre in Brooklyn
 the Teller's Shubert Theatre in Brooklyn
 the Shubert Majestic Theatre in Brooklyn
 the Bronx Opera House
 the Shubert Crescent in Brooklyn
 the Riviera Theatre at Broadway and 97th Street

1923

 the Montauk Theatre in Brooklyn
 the Teller's Shubert Theatre in Brooklyn
 the Shubert Majestic Theatre in Brooklyn
 the Bronx Opera House
 the Broad Street Theatre in Newark
 the Riviera Theatre at Broadway and 97th Street

References

Theatres in New York City
20th century in New York City
Roaring Twenties